X-linked interleukin-1 receptor accessory protein-like 1 is a protein that in humans is encoded by the IL1RAPL1 gene. IL1RAPL1 is composed of 11 exons, about 1.37 Mb total.

Function 

The protein encoded by this gene is a member of the interleukin-1 receptor family and is similar to the interleukin 1 accessory proteins. It is most closely related to interleukin 1 receptor accessory protein-like 2 (IL1RAPL2).

Clinical significance 

This gene and IL1RAPL2 are located at a region on chromosome X that is associated with X-linked non-syndromic mental retardation. Deletions and mutations in this gene were found in patients with mental retardation. This gene is expressed at a high level in post-natal brain structures involved in the hippocampal memory system, which suggests a specialized role in the physiological processes underlying memory and learning abilities.

References

Further reading